Jim Hill (born April 23, 1947) is an American attorney, financial consultant, and politician who served two terms as Oregon State Treasurer from January 4, 1993, to January 1, 2001. Hill had previously served in both chambers of the Oregon Legislative Assembly.

Early life and education
He was born in Atlanta, Georgia. He earned a Bachelor of Arts degree in economics from Michigan State University in 1969. He received both an MBA (1971) and a Juris Doctor (1974) from Indiana University Bloomington.

Career 
Hill was elected treasurer in 1992, the first African American elected to statewide office in Oregon. He had previously served in the Oregon State Senate (1987–1993) and the Oregon House of Representatives (1983–1987). He ran unsuccessfully for the House in 1980, and for governor in 2002 and 2006.

In 2010, Hill was briefly a candidate in the special election for Oregon State Treasurer, to complete the term of Ben Westlund, who died in office.

Personal life 
Divorced with one grown daughter, Hill resides in Salem, Oregon.

References

1947 births
Living people
Indiana University alumni
Michigan State University alumni
Oregon lawyers
State treasurers of Oregon
Democratic Party members of the Oregon House of Representatives
Democratic Party Oregon state senators
Politicians from Salem, Oregon
African-American people in Oregon politics
Politicians from Atlanta
African-American state legislators in Oregon
Lawyers from Salem, Oregon
African-American history of Oregon
21st-century African-American people
20th-century African-American people